The New Revised Standard Version (NRSV) is a translation of the Bible in contemporary English. Published in 1989 by the National Council of Churches, the NRSV was created by an ecumenical committee of scholars "comprising about thirty members." The NRSV relies on recently published critical editions of the original Hebrew, Aramaic, and Greek texts. A major revision, the New Revised Standard Version Updated Edition (NRSVue), was released in 2021.

Used broadly among biblical scholarship, the NRSV was intended as a translation to serve the devotional, liturgical, and scholarly needs of the broadest possible range of Christian religious adherents.

The tradition of the King James Version has been continued in the Revised Standard Version and in the New Revised Standard Version. The full 84 book translation includes the Protestant enumeration of the Old Testament, the Apocrypha, and the New Testament; another version of the NRSV includes the deuterocanonical books as part of the Old Testament, which is normative in the canon of Roman Catholicism, along with the New Testament (totalling 73 books).

The translation appears in three main formats: (1) an edition including the Protestant enumeration of the Old Testament, the Apocrypha, and the New Testament (as well an edition that only includes the Protestant enumeration of the Old Testament and New Testament); (2) a Roman Catholic Edition with all the books of that canon in their customary order, and (3) the Common Bible, which includes the books that appear in Protestant, Catholic, and Eastern Orthodox canons (but not additional books from Oriental Orthodox traditions, including the Syriac and Ethiopian canons). A special edition of the NRSV, called the "Anglicized Edition," employs British English spelling and grammar instead of American English.

History 
The New Revised Standard Version was translated by the Division of Christian Education (now Bible Translation and Utilization) of the National Council of Churches. The group included scholars representing Orthodox, Catholic and Protestant Christian groups as well as Jewish representation in the group responsible for the Hebrew Scriptures or Old Testament. The mandate given the committee was summarized in a dictum: “As literal as possible, as free as necessary.”

Committee of translators 
The following scholars were active on the NRSV Committee of translators at the time of publication.

 William A. Beardslee
 Phyllis A. Bird
 George Coats
 Demetrios J. Constantelos
 Robert C. Dentan
 Alexander A. DiLella, OFM
 J. Cheryl Exum
 Reginald H. Fuller
 Paul D. Hanson
 Walter Harrelson
 William L. Holladay
 Sherman E. Johnson
 Robert A. Kraft
 George M. Landes
 Conrad E. L’Heureux
 S. Dean McBride, Jr.
 Bruce M. Metzger
 Patrick D. Miller
 Paul S. Minear
 Lucetta Mowry
 Roland E. Murphy, O. Carm.
 Harry Orlinsky
 Marvin H. Pope
 Jimmy Jack McBee Roberts
 Alfred v. Rohr Sauer
 Katharine D. Sakenfeld
 James A. Sanders
 Gene M. Tucker
 Eugene C. Ulrich
 Allen Wikgren

Principles of revision

Improved manuscripts and translations 
The Old Testament translation of the RSV was completed before the Dead Sea Scrolls were available to scholars. The NRSV was intended to take advantage of this and other manuscript discoveries, and to reflect advances in scholarship.

Gender language 
In the preface to the NRSV Bruce Metzger wrote for the committee that “many in the churches have become sensitive to the danger of linguistic sexism arising from the inherent bias of the English language towards the masculine gender, a bias that in the case of the Bible has often restricted or obscured the meaning of the original text”. The RSV observed the older convention of using masculine nouns in a gender-neutral sense (e.g. "man" instead of "person"), and in some cases used a masculine word where the source language used a neutral word. This move has been widely criticised by some, including within the Catholic Church, and continues to be a point of contention today. The NRSV by contrast adopted a policy of inclusiveness in gender language. According to Metzger, “The mandates from the Division specified that, in references to men and women, masculine-oriented language should be eliminated as far as this can be done without altering passages that reflect the historical situation of ancient patriarchal culture.”

Reception 

Many mainline Protestant churches officially approve the NRSV for both private and public use.  The Episcopal Church (United States) in Canon II.2 added the NRSV to the list of translations approved for church services. It is also widely used by the United Methodist Church, the Evangelical Lutheran Church in America, the Christian Church (Disciples of Christ),  the Presbyterian Church (USA), the Presbyterian Church in Canada, the United Church of Christ, the Reformed Church in America, the United Church of Canada, and the Uniting Church in Australia.

In accordance with the 1983 Code of Canon Law, Canon 825.1, the NRSV with the deuterocanonical books received the Imprimatur of the United States Conference of Catholic Bishops and the Canadian Conference of Catholic Bishops, meaning that the NRSV (Catholic Edition) is officially approved by the Catholic Church and can be profitably used by Catholics in private study and devotional reading. The New Revised Standard Version, Catholic Edition also has the imprimatur, granted on 12 September 1991 and 15 October 1991, respectively. For public worship, such as at weekly Mass, most Catholic Bishops Conferences in English-speaking countries require the use of other translations, either the adapted New American Bible in the dioceses of the United States and the Philippines or the English Standard Version and Revised New Jerusalem Bible in most of the rest of the English-speaking world. However, the Canadian conference and the Vatican approved a modification of the NRSV for lectionary use in 2008. The NRSV, along with the Revised Standard Version, is also quoted in several places in the English-language edition of the Catechism of the Catholic Church, the latter of which summarizes Catholic doctrine and belief in written form.

In 1990 the synod of the Orthodox Church in America decided not to permit use of the NRSV in liturgy or in Bible studies on the grounds that it is highly "divergent from the Holy Scriptures traditionally read aloud in the sacred services of the Church", though the National Council of Churches notes that the translation has "the blessing of a leader of the Greek Orthodox Church."

NRSV Updated Edition (NRSVue) 

The New Revised Standard Version Updated Edition (NRSVue) is a major revision of the NRSV. A three-year process of reviewing and updating the text of the NRSV was announced at the 2017 Annual Meeting of the Society of Biblical Literature. The update was managed by the SBL following an agreement with the copyright-holding NCC. The stated focuses of the review are incorporating advances in textual criticism since the 1989 publication of the NRSV, improving the textual notes, and reviewing the style and rendering of the translation. A team of more than fifty scholars, led by an editorial board, is responsible for the review. It was released for digital purchase on December 25, 2021, with the first print editions following in 2022.

Study editions 
 The Harper Study Bible (Zondervan, 1991)
 NRSV Reference Bible with the Apocrypha (Zondervan, 1993)
 NRSV Student Bible (Zondervan, 1996)
 The Cambridge Annotated Study Bible (Cambridge University Press, 1993)
 The HarperCollins Study Bible with Apocrypha (Society of Biblical Literature, 1997)
 The Access Bible with Apocrypha (Oxford University Press, 1999)
 The Spiritual Formation Bible (Zondervan, 1999)
 The New Interpreter's Study Bible with Apocrypha (United Methodist Publishing House, 2003)
 The HarperCollins Study Bible: Fully Revised & Updated (HarperOne, 2006)
 The Green Bible (HarperOne, 2008)
 The Discipleship Study Bible (Westminster John Knox, 2008)
 The Life with God Bible (Renovaré, 2009)
 Lutheran Study Bible (Augsburg Fortress, 2009)
 The Wesley Study Bible (United Methodist Publishing House, 2009)
 The Guidebook: The NRSV Student Bible (Zondervan, 2012)
 The Jewish Annotated New Testament, 2nd edition (Oxford University Press, 2017)
 The New Oxford Annotated Bible with Apocrypha, 5th edition (Oxford University Press, 2018)
 NRSV Cultural Backgrounds Study Bible (Zondervan, 2019)
 Baylor Annotated Study Bible (Baylor University Press, 2019)
 The Word on Fire Bible (Volume 1): The Gospels (Word on Fire, 2020)

Canon 
The New Revised Standard Version is available in an 84-book Ecumenical Bible that includes the Old Testament, Apocrypha and New Testament; a 66-book Protestant Bible that only includes the Old Testament and New Testament; and a 73-book Catholic edition containing the Catholic enumeration of the Old Testament and the New Testament. A third edition incorporates the Eastern Orthodox canon.

Notes

References

External links 

 Official webpage (NRSVue)
 Religion: Farewell To Thee's and He's, Time magazine
 The National Council of Churches
 New Revised Standard Version

1989 books
1989 in Christianity
Bible translations into English